Ysaÿe Quartet is the name of two string quartets:

 Ysaÿe Quartet (1886), established by Eugène Ysaÿe
 Ysaÿe Quartet (1984), named after the original quartet